Criminal procedure is the adjudication process of the criminal law. While criminal procedure differs dramatically by jurisdiction, the process generally begins with a formal criminal charge with the person on trial either being free on bail or incarcerated, and results in the conviction or acquittal of the defendant. Criminal procedure can be either in form of inquisitorial or adversarial criminal procedure.

Basic rights
Currently, in many countries with a democratic system and the rule of law, criminal procedure puts the burden of proof on the prosecution – that is, it is up to the prosecution to prove that the defendant is guilty beyond any reasonable doubt, as opposed to having the defense prove that they are innocent, and any doubt is resolved in favor of the defendant. This provision, known as the presumption of innocence, is required, for example, in the 46 countries that are members of the Council of Europe, under Article 6 of the European Convention on Human Rights, and it is included in other human rights documents. However, in practice it operates somewhat differently in different countries. Such basic rights also include the right for the defendant to know what offence he or she has been arrested for or is being charged with, and the right to appear before a judicial official within a certain time of being arrested. Many jurisdictions also allow the defendant the right to legal counsel and provide any defendant who cannot afford their own lawyer with a lawyer paid for at the public expense.

Difference in criminal and civil procedures
Most countries make a rather clear distinction between civil and criminal procedures. For example, an English criminal court may force a defendant to pay a fine as punishment for his crime, and he may sometimes have to pay the legal costs of the prosecution. But the victim of the crime pursues his claim for compensation in a civil, not a criminal, action. In France, Italy, and many countries besides, the victim of a crime (known as the "injured party") may be awarded damages by a criminal court judge.

The standards of proof are higher in a criminal action than in a civil one since the loser risks not only financial penalties but also being sent to prison (or, in some countries, execution). In English law the prosecution must prove the guilt of a criminal "beyond reasonable doubt"; but the plaintiff in a civil action is required to prove his case "on the balance of probabilities". "Beyond reasonable doubt" is not defined for the jury which decides the verdict, but it has been said by appeal courts that proving guilt beyond reasonable doubt requires the prosecution to exclude any reasonable hypothesis consistent with innocence: Plomp v. R. In a civil case, however, the court simply weighs the evidence and decides what is most probable.

Criminal and civil procedure are different. Although some systems, including the English, allow a private citizen to bring a criminal prosecution against another citizen, criminal actions are nearly always started by the state. Civil actions, on the other hand, are usually started by individuals.

In Anglo-American law, the party bringing a criminal action (that is, in most cases, the state) is called the prosecution, but the party bringing a civil action is the plaintiff. In both kinds of action the other party is known as the defendant. A criminal case in the United States against a person named Ms. Sanchez would be entitled United States v. (short for versus, or against) Sanchez if initiated by the federal government; if brought by a state, the case would typically be called State v. Sanchez or People v. Sanchez. In the United Kingdom, the criminal case would be styled R. (short for Rex or Regina, that is, the King or Queen) v. Sanchez. In both the United States and the United Kingdom, a civil action between Ms. Sanchez and a Mr. Smith would be Sanchez v. Smith if started by Sanchez and Smith v. Sanchez if begun by Smith.

Evidence given at a criminal trial is not necessarily admissible in a civil action about the same matter, just as evidence given in a civil cause is not necessarily admissible on a criminal trial. For example, the victim of a road accident does not directly benefit if the driver who injured him is found guilty of the crime of careless driving. He still has to prove his case in a civil action. In fact he may be able to prove his civil case even when the driver is found not guilty in the criminal trial. If the accused has given evidence on his trial he may be cross-examined on those statements in a subsequent civil action regardless of the criminal verdict.

Once the plaintiff has shown that the defendant is liable, the main argument in a civil court is about the amount of money, or damages, which the defendant should pay to the plaintiff.

Differences between civil law and common law systems
 The majority of civil law jurisdictions ('civil law' as a type of law system, not as opposed to criminal law) follow an inquisitorial system of adjudication, in which judges undertake an active investigation of the claims by examining the evidence at the trial (while other judges contribute likewise by preparing reports).
 In common law systems, the trial judge presides over proceedings grounded in the adversarial system of dispute resolution, where both the prosecution and the defence prepare arguments to be presented before the court. Some civil law systems have adopted adversarial procedures.

Proponents of either system tend to consider that their system defends best the rights of the innocent. There is a tendency in common law countries to believe that civil law / inquisitorial systems do not have the so-called "presumption of innocence", and do not provide the defence with adequate rights. Conversely, there is a tendency in countries with an inquisitorial system to believe that accusatorial proceedings unduly favour rich defendants who can afford large legal teams, and therefore disfavour poorer defendants.

See also
 Offence (law)
 Trial (law)
 Civil procedure
 Code of Criminal Procedure, 1973 of India
 Court Appointed Special Advocates
 Criminal Procedure Act
 Criminal procedure in the United States
 Italian Criminal Procedure
 Code of Criminal Procedure (Japan)
 Criminal Procedure Code (Malaysia)
 Criminal Procedure Code (Ukraine)

References

Further reading